Halfdan Petterøe (30 January 1906 – 15 February 1994) was a Norwegian equestrian. He competed in two events at the 1936 Summer Olympics.

References

1906 births
1994 deaths
Norwegian male equestrians
Olympic equestrians of Norway
Equestrians at the 1936 Summer Olympics
Sportspeople from Oslo